The Lorraine 5P, also called the Lorraine 100CV, Lorraine 110CV and Lorraine 120CV, was a family of five-cylinder air-cooled radial engines designed and built in France by Lorraine-Dietrich during the 1920s and 1930s.

Variants
5Pa also called the Lorraine 100CV,  (125x140)
5Pb also called the Lorraine 110CV,  (125x140)
5Pc also called the Lorraine 120CV,  (130x140)

Applications
 Bloch 61
 Caudron C.221
 Dewoitine 481
 FBA 310 (5Pc)
 SAB DB-81
 Caproni Ca.97

Specifications (5Pc)

References

Notes

Bibliography

 

1920s aircraft piston engines
5P